Xfinity Theatre (originally known as the Meadows Music Theatre) is an outdoor/indoor amphitheatre located in Hartford, Connecticut, owned by Live Nation. The capacity of the venue is 30,000. The indoor area holds 7,500 and the outdoor lawn area holds an additional 22,500 during the summer months making it one of the largest amphitheatres in the country. Live Nation predecessor SFX bought the theatre in 1997.

Notable performances

The Spice Girls played a show on July 3rd, 1998 during their Spiceworld Tour.

On June 6th, 2001 Aerosmith kicked off the North American leg of their Just Push Play tour, with the show airing live on VH1. 

At the 2013 Funny or Die: Oddball Comedy Festival comedic headliner Dave Chappelle refused to perform his routine after he experienced what he considered to be heckling from audience members. He instead remained on stage for the minimum amount of time his contract required him to and smoked cigarettes while taunting the audience. He said things such as "if North Korea were to drop the bomb tomorrow, he would hope it lands in Hartford, Connecticut." He returned for an unannounced appearance at the festival the next year to apologize to the crowd.

See also
List of contemporary amphitheatres
Live Nation

References

External links
Building information

Buildings and structures in Hartford, Connecticut
Theatres in Connecticut
Music venues in Connecticut
Tourist attractions in Hartford, Connecticut